Seventh Avenue Line may refer to any of the following transit lines in New York City:
IRT Broadway – Seventh Avenue Line, a New York City Subway line serving the  trains
Seventh Avenue Line (Brooklyn surface) (bus, formerly streetcar)
Seventh Avenue Line (Manhattan surface) (bus, formerly streetcar)